Reed Island State Park is a public recreation area on the Columbia River  east of Washougal in Clark County, Washington. The state park comprises  Reed island and is only accessible by boat. The island, which is part of the Columbia River Water Trail, has primitive camping and picnicking areas.

References

External links
Reed Island State Park Washington State Parks and Recreation Commission 
Reed Island State Park Map Washington State Parks and Recreation Commission

Parks in Clark County, Washington
Portland metropolitan area
State parks of Washington (state)